Jeffrey Stuut (born 25 May 1995) is a Dutch para-alpine skier.

He won bronze medals at the 2017 World Para Alpine Skiing Championships in both the Downhill and Super-G events. He represented the Netherlands at the 2018 Winter Paralympics held in Pyeongchang, South Korea.

He qualified to represent the Netherlands at the 2022 Winter Paralympics in Beijing, China. He competed in several alpine skiing events.

References

External links 
 

1995 births
Living people
Dutch male alpine skiers
Paralympic alpine skiers of the Netherlands
Alpine skiers at the 2018 Winter Paralympics
Alpine skiers at the 2022 Winter Paralympics
People from Hoorn
Sportspeople from North Holland
21st-century Dutch people